There is a 3D online virtual world created by Will Harvey and Jeffrey Ventrella. There Inc. was founded in the spring of 1998. Closed beta began in July 2001, with various stages of beta following, and ending with an October 2003 launch date. On March 9, 2010 - one week after the announcement of its closure on March 2, 2010 - There.com shut its doors to the public.

On May 18, 2011, Michael Wilson announced that There.com will be re-opening, on the There.com homepage. All previous members will have access to their old avatars.

On May 2, 2012, There reopened to the public for a monthly subscription fee.

Corporate history
From 1998 - 2003, Tom Melcher served as chief executive of There Inc. and There.com Melcher was previously an Executive Vice President for CNET. Mr. Melcher once described There.com's archetypal user as "the woman who is in her 30s, single, really overweight, lives in a small town." In 2003, Melcher stepped down as CEO.

In June 2004, There Inc. went through a restructuring and announced major layoffs. In April 2005, There Inc. announced that the commercial side of the company would be branching out to form two companies: Forterra Systems (the government-contracted client) and Makena Technologies (the commercial client).

In 2006, Makena Technologies announced a partnership with MTV Networks to provide the technology platform for their virtual worlds which include Virtual Laguna Beach, The Virtual Hills, Virtual Pimp My Ride, Virtual Real World, Virtual Newport Harbor, Virtual VMAs (Video Music Awards), Virtual Kaya, Virtual Rob and Big and Virtual Life of Ryan. Makena Technologies also has a partnership with Trilogy Studios.

Corporate brands that had a presence in There.com included Coca-Cola, CosmoGIRL!, Humane Society of the U.S., Capitol Music Group, Paramount Studios, bebe, NaCo USA, K-SWISS, Country Music Hall of Fame and Museum, Nike, Levi's, and Scion.

In 2008, Makena Technologies launched ThereConnect, allowing There.com members to showcase their in-world profiles, skills, groups and upcoming events on their Facebook pages. They also announced ThereIM, a lightweight instant messaging client where users can communicate with other members’ avatars, whether or not they are signed into the virtual world.

On March 9, 2010 at 11:59 PM Pacific Standard Time, There.com shut down its virtual world for the final time. The CEO of There, inc., has stated very clearly (both privately and publicly) that Makena has no plans of re-opening There.com. There.com offered refunds for all "Therebucks" purchased between February 1, 2010 and March 9, 2010. As of April 1, refunds are no longer available.

On May 18, 2011, Michael Wilson announced that There.com will be re-opening. On May 2, 2012, There re-opened to the public.

Details
There is a venue for socializing with less role-playing than is typically found in MMORPGs.  Billed on its homepage as "...an online getaway where you can hang out with your friends and meet new ones...", There defines itself as a service providing a shared experience that allows people to interact in an online society.  As of There's reopening in May, 2012, the virtual world is only open to ages 18 and older.

Each new member can enter the community by choosing a unique name and a male or female avatar.  The avatar's name and gender are permanently set, but various attributes such as hair color and style, head and body shapes, skin and eye color, clothing, etc. can be changed as desired. Through their avatars, members can communicate in real-time using emotions, body language, text chat and voice to express themselves.

In addition to customizing their avatars, members can create their own items, such as clothing, vehicles, buildings and furniture, and sell them to others for use in the world. Each object created undergoes a community based submission procedure to ensure its accuracy as well as compliance with international copyright laws. Detailed instructions are available at the developer site provided by Makena, and in world classes are offered for the novice as well as experienced graphic artist. All classes are without charge and open to all.
  
Most items such as furniture are designed to be used within houses or zones, although some items such as vehicles and dogs are not, due to their mobile nature. Monetary transactions in There's economy are done using Therebucks (T$), virtual currency.  Therebucks can be purchased directly from There at 1,800 Tbux to US$1.

Members of There.com can participate in activities such as racing vehicles, playing cards, flying, designing homes, playing paintball, hoverboarding and training virtual pets. There is also access to special interest groups devoted to topics including recreation, business, the environment, education and the arts.

In September 2007, all members of There Philippines were moved to the original version. They were required to change usernames (if necessary), and could not bring anything with them but  during the change.

Life in There
Each new member can enter the community by choosing a unique name and a male or female avatar. The avatar's name and gender are permanently set, but various attributes such as hair color and style, head and body shapes, skin and eye color, clothing, etc. can be changed as desired.

Arranging content within houses or zones to create living quarters, meeting places, game rooms, movie sets, race tracks, mazes, yard sales—in short, whatever the member can imagine using available materials. In addition to houses, "fun zones", and "frontier zones" which maintain a fixed presence and location in the world, There also features "porta-zones", portable zones that can be relocated or removed from the world when not in use. Porta-zones (or "PAZs") do not incur rental fees when not in the world. Houses and zones are rented from There on a monthly basis. Neighborhoods and neighborhood lots are the most recent additions to There's suite of porta-zones. Members are able to design custom content using There-provided tools and templates, Gmax, and a graphics editor such as Photoshop, Paint Shop Pro or The Gimp. These can then be bought, sold, and traded in the There world. Most items such as furniture were designed to be used within houses or zones, although some items such as vehicles and dogs are not due to their mobile nature. Monetary transactions in There's economy are done using a form of virtual currency called Therebucks. Therebucks can be purchased directly from There.

Size
As of March 2009, There contained 14 major islands, dozens of smaller islands, over 1 million members, and many community places including businesses.

See also
 Active Worlds
 CC Metro
 Kaneva
 PlayStation Home
 Second Life
 Simulated reality
Twinity

References

External links
 There.com
 New Economy; A nerdy entrepreneur dreamed of a better place. Now he's made one, using $33 million and some virtual dune buggies

Lua (programming language)-scripted video games
MacOS games
Video games developed in the United States
Virtual economies
Virtual world communities
Massively multiplayer online role-playing games
2003 video games
Windows games